Eugène Lefébure (11 November 1838 – 9 April 1908) was a French Egyptologist born at Prunoy.

Working with the French Archaeological Mission in the Valley of the Kings, he worked in the tomb of Ramesses IV (KV2). He also documented the tomb of Seti I and drew up plans for KV26, KV27, KV28, KV29, KV37, KV40, and KV59 and also WV24 and WV25. These plans, with the descriptions of their work, were published in the following:

Publications
 “Les Hypogées royaux of Thèbes”, 1889
 Rites égyptiens : construction et protection des édifices, 1996

French Egyptologists
1838 births
1908 deaths
Members of the Institut Français d'Archéologie Orientale